Ellerington may refer to:

Bill Ellerington (1923–2015), English footballer
Bill Ellerington Sr. (1892–1948), English professional footballer
Harold Ellerington (1912–1986), English professional rugby league footballer

See also
Ellenton (disambiguation)
Ellerton (disambiguation)
Ellington (disambiguation)